Changchun Yatai Football Club is a professional Chinese football club that currently participates in the Chinese Super League under licence from the Chinese Football Association (CFA). The team is based in Changchun, Jilin and their home stadium is the Changchun Stadium that has a seating capacity of 38,500. The club's founder and main investor is the private Chinese conglomerate Jilin Yatai Group.

The club was formed on 6 June 1996 before making their debut in the third tier of China's football league pyramid in the 1997 league season. In 2000 they bought a position into the second division after they merged with Huizhou PLA Saonon. In 2001 they finished runners-up within their division, however they were denied promotion after they were embroiled in a match-fixing scandal. The club would reform and re-apply for a CFA playing license before they eventually gained promotion to China's top flight at the end of the 2005 league campaign. In the 2007 Chinese Super League they won the league title and participated in the 2008 AFC Champions League for the first time. They have since gone on to come second within 2009 Chinese Super League and also participated in the 2010 AFC Champions League.

Club history
Changchun Yatai was founded on 6 June 1996 by local conglomerate Jilin Yatai Group in Changchun, Jilin to take part in the recently fully professionalized league system, which allowed private enterprises to own their own clubs. The club would select a dragon kicking a ball as their crest while assembling the club's senior team and to make sure they had a competitive youth system they also brought in the best youth players from Shenyang before moving them into their recently created football training base at a cost of two million yuan, while the total cost of starting the whole enterprise would end up being 20 million yuan. For the next several seasons the club achieved very little until they bought a position into the second tier when the club took over Huizhou PLA Saonon at the beginning of the 2000 league season for fifteen million yuan, while during the season the team maintained an unbeaten home record but still finished in a disappointing fifth at the end of the season. The following season the club's manager Yin Tiesheng looked like he could improve upon last years results when he guided the club to a runners-up position and what looked like promotion to the top tier for the first time, however it was soon discovered that 6 October 2001 game that Changchun won 6–0 against Zhejiang Green Town was fixed. This saw the club denied promotion, had all offending participants banned for a year while the club had three months to reform and re-apply for a CFA playing license. Despite this Yin Tiesheng stayed on and promoted future Chinese internationals Du Zhenyu, Zhang Xiaofei and Cao Tianbao from the club's youth team which was assembled from Shenyang into the senior team. These players in 2003 would go on to win the Jia B (second level) title, but the club were not promoted due to the creation of the Super League.

Yin Tiesheng would leave the club in 2004 to take the Chinese U20 head coach position and Chen Jingang was brought in as the new manager. Within his reign Chen Jingang guided the club to a runners-up spot in the China League One division in 2005 and promotion to the Super League. In the club's debut season they finished fourth, however Chen Jingang was relieved of his duties after he lost the dressing room by threatening to dock player wagers if he was unsatisfied with their performances. In 2007 Gao Hongbo was brought as the new manager and in his debut season he won the Chinese Super League title with them. This would see Changchun allowed entry to the 2008 AFC Champions League for the first time along with Beijing Guoan and played their first game against Vietnamese football club Bình Dương on 12 March 2008 in a 2–1 victory While the club finished the group runners-up only one team was allowed to go through the knock out stages and the club crashed out of the tournament, this unfortunately affected the club's league performance and Gao Hongbo was fired during the season.

In September 2008 Li Shubin was brought in to manage the club and to see out the remainder of the 2008 league season, however under his leadership results improved and the club went on to have an industrious following campaign that saw them come runners-up at the end of the 2009 Chinese Super League campaign. Despite achieving consistently good performances for the team the club decided that they wanted Shen Xiangfu to manage the team for the following season and within one of his first games for the club in the 2010 AFC Champions League on 9 March 2010 Changchun beat Indonesian side Persipura Jayapura 9–0, making the victory the largest ever within the AFC Champions League for a Chinese side. Shen Xiangfu was however, unable to guide Changchun into the knock out stages despite there being two places up for grabs and his league performances were not impressive, despite this the club held on to him for another season where he fared little better and at the beginning of the 2012 Chinese Super League season the club brought in Svetozar Šapurić as the club's new manager.

In the 2018 Chinese Super League, Changchun underperformed in the last third of the season, finishing 15th. The team was relegated to the China League One. The 2019 season saw Changchun come close to earning promotion immediately back into the top tier, with a ten-game unbeaten streak in the middle of the season. Ultimately, though, the club slipped towards the end of the season and finished the campaign in fifth place. However, Changchun won the 2020 China League One title and returned to the Chinese Super League after a two-year absence.

Current squad

First team squad

Reserve squad
Updated 20 April 2022

Retired numbers

12 – Club Supporters (the 12th Man) retired in 2017.

Out on loan

Coaching staff

Managerial history
.

 Tang Pengju (1997–98)
 Yin Tiesheng (1999–04)
 Qu Gang (interim) (2004 – 26 Apr 2004)
 Li Hui (26 Apr 2004 – 6 July 2004)
 Chen Jingang (18 July 2004 – 2006)
 Arie Schans (1 Jan 2005 – 31 Dec 2007) Team leader
 Gao Hongbo (1 Jan 2007 – 5 July 2008)
 Li Shubin (interim) (20 July 2008 – 31 Dec 2008)
 Ernst Middendorp (27 July 2008 – 31 Dec 2008)
 Li Shubin (interim) (Sept 2008 – 25 Dec 2008)
 Li Shubin (1 Jan 2009 – 31 Dec 2009)
 Shen Xiangfu (2010–11)
 Svetozar Šapurić (24 Nov 2011 – 28 Dec 2012)
 Li Shubin (28 Dec 2012 – 20 May 2013)
 Svetozar Šapurić (21 May 2013 – 21 April 2014)
 Gao Jinggang (interim) (21 April 2014 – 28 April 2014)
 Dragan Okuka (28 April 2014 – 12 Nov 2014)
 Gao Jinggang (19 Dec 2014 – 12 Jun 2015)
 Marijo Tot (12 Jun 2015 – 31 Dec 2015)
 Slaviša Stojanovič (13 Jan 2016 –4 May 2016)
 Lee Jang-soo (6 May 2016 –4 May 2017)
 Chen Jingang (4 May 2017 –6 Jun 2019)
 Svetozar Šapurić (9 Jun 2019 – 2 Dec 2019)
 Samvel Babayan (2 Dec 2019 – 5 Oct 2020)
 Chen Yang (5 Oct 2020 – )

Honours

League
Chinese Super League
Champions: 2007
Runners-up: 2009

China League One/Jia-B League
Champions: 2003, 2020
Runners-up: 2001, 2005

Results
All-time League rankings

As of the end of 2020 season.

Did not enter in 1998 campaign.
 In group stages.  Promotion to Jia-A league was cancelled due to match fixing.  No promotion.

Key
 Pld = Played
 W = Games won
 D = Games drawn
 L = Games lost
 F = Goals for
 A = Goals against
 Pts = Points
 Pos = Final position

 DNQ = Did not qualify
 DNE = Did not enter
 NH = Not Held
 R1 = Round 1
 R2 = Round 2
 R3 = Round 3
 R4 = Round 4

 F = Final
 SF = Semi-finals
 QF = Quarter-finals
 R16 = Round of 16
 Group = Group stage
 GS2 = Second Group stage
 QR1 = First Qualifying Round
 QR2 = Second Qualifying Round
 QR3 = Third Qualifying Round

References

External links
Official Site 

 
Football clubs in China
Association football clubs established in 1996
Sport in Changchun
1996 establishments in China